Field jacket can refer to any one of several US Military jackets:

 M1941 Field Jacket, worn from 1941 till 1943
 M-1943 Field Jacket, worn from 1943 till 1951
 M-1951 field jacket, worn from 1951 till 1965
 M-1965 field jacket, worn from 1965 till 2009